The 1926–27 season saw Rochdale compete for their 6th season in the Football League Third Division North.

Statistics

																

|}

Final league table

Competitions

Football League Third Division North

FA Cup

Lancashire Cup

Manchester Cup

References

Rochdale A.F.C. seasons
Rochdale